The 2nd Screen Actors Guild Awards, honoring the best achievements in film and television performances for the year 1995, took place on February 24, 1996. The ceremony was held at the Santa Monica Civic Auditorium in Los Angeles, California, and was televised live by NBC. The nominees were announced on January 18, 1996. This was the first year the category of Outstanding Performance by a Cast in a Motion Picture was offered.

Winners and nominees
Winners are listed first and highlighted in boldface.

Screen Actors Guild Life Achievement Award
 Robert Redford

Film

Television

References

External links
 The 2nd Annual Screen Actors Guild Awards

1995
1995 film awards
1995 television awards
Screen
Screen Actors Guild
Screen
February 1996 events in the United States